"Reggae Night" is a 1983 single by reggae artist Jimmy Cliff, from his album The Power and the Glory. It was released by Columbia Records in the USA, Canada and Mexico and in most European countries on CBS Records. Written by Amir Bayyan and La Toya Jackson, it became an international hit for Jimmy Cliff.

Track listing
"Reggae Night" (3:58)
"Reggae Night (instrumental)" (3:58)

Charts

Weekly charts

Year-end charts

Cover versions
The song has been covered by a number of artists, including La Toya Jackson, who co-wrote the song, on her album No Relations. German Eurodance group Beat System released their version in 1996 which reached the top 40 in Belgium.

See also
List of number-one singles from the 1980s (New Zealand)

References

1983 songs
1983 singles
Jimmy Cliff songs
Number-one singles in New Zealand
Columbia Records singles
Songs about reggae
Songs about nights
Songs written by Amir Bayyan
Songs written by La Toya Jackson